Abura-Asebu is one of the constituencies represented in the Parliament of Ghana. It elects one Member of Parliament (MP) by the first past the post system of election. Abura-Asebu is located in the Abura/Asebu/Kwamankese district of the Central Region of Ghana.

Boundaries
The seat is located entirely within the Abura/Asebu/Kwamankese district of the Central Region of Ghana.

Members of Parliament

Elections

See also
List of Ghana Parliament constituencies
Abura/Asebu/Kwamankese District

References 

Parliamentary constituencies in the Central Region (Ghana)